The 12th Maine Infantry Regiment was an infantry regiment that served in the Union Army during the American Civil War.

Formation
The 12th Maine Regiment, formed in November 1861, was one of the 10 regiments Major General Benjamin F. Butler of Massachusetts received permission to form.

George F. Shepley a Democrat and a noted Portland lawyer and U.S. Attorney for Maine, headed the new regiment.

On Oct. 1, 1861, Shepley wrote to Maine Gov. Israel Washburn to report that he expected the new 12th Maine Regiment to be filled soon "with the very best men in the State."

Shepley also reported, "I have abandoned every other thought and pursuit, and have embarked in this movement all my hopes energies and efforts and, if need be my fortune and my life."

Accounts of engagements
The 12th Maine in Louisiana
According to the New York Times, "The town of Madisonville, La., on the other side of Lake Pontchartrain, has been captured without resistance and is now garrisoned by our forces. The expedition consisted of a portion of the Maine Twelfth, the Connecticut Ninth, two battalions from the convalescent camp of the Thirteenth Corps, the Massachusetts Fifteenth battery, battery of the United States artillery and a company of the Louisiana Second cavalry, the whole under the command of Col. Kimrall, of the Maine Twelfth.

The 8th of January was observed by a salute at meridian by order of Gen. Banks.

The great Union mass meeting was held here the same night at the St. Charles Theatre, which was crowded from pit to dome, including a large number of planters from up and down the river. Speeches were made by Messrs. Flandres, L. Madison Day, and Thos. J. Durant."

Significant events
1861
 November 16 Organized at Portland and mustered in
 November 24 Unit left Maine for Camp Stevens, Mass.
 December 22 Unit in the midst of training at Camp Chase, Mass.
 December 30 To Boston
1862
 January 2 Embarked on Steamer Constitution for Ship Island, Miss.
 February 12 Arrived Ship Island. Attached to Butler's Expeditionary Corps.
 March Attached to 3rd Brigade, Dept. of the Gulf
 May 4  Moved to New Orleans and duty at U.S. Mint
 June 16–20 Expedition to Pass Manchac
 June 17 Pass Manchac
 September 13–18 Expedition to Ponchatoula (Companies C, D & F)
 September 15 Pouchatoula
 October 21 Moved to Camp Parapet
 November 19 Moved to Baton Rouge, La. Attached to Grover's Division, Baton Rouge, La., Dept. Gulf
1863
 January Attached to 2nd Brigade, 4th Division, 19th Army Corps, Dept. Gulf
 February Attached to 1st Brigade, 2nd Division, 19th Corps, Dept. Gulf
 March 7–27 Operations against Port Hudson
 April 9-May 14 Moved to Donaldsonville. Operations in Western Louisiana
 April 11–20 Teche Campaign
 April 13 Porter's and McWilliams' Plantation at Indian Head
 April 14 Irish Bend
 April 18 Destruction of salt works at New Iberia
 April 20-May 20 Advance to the Red River
 May 21–24 Advance on Port Hudson
 May 24-July 8 Siege of Port Hudson
 May 27 Assault on Port Hudson
 June 14 Second Assault on Port Hudson
 June 20 Thibodeaux (Detachment)
 July 9 Surrender of Port Hudson
 July 13 Donaldsville
 August 12 Moved to New Orleans, then to Ship island, Miss.
 October  At Camp Parapet
1864
   
 January 3–7 Expedition to Madisonville (Companies B, F, K)
 January 7 Capture of Madisonville
 March 11 Ordered to New Orleans
 April to June 16 Veterans on furlough, Non-Veterans at Camp Parapet
 May 27 Veterans returned from Portland to New Orleans
 June 16 Regiment moved to Morganza, La.
 July 3 Moved to Algiers
 July 13–20 To Fort Monroe, Va.
 July 21  To Bermuda Hundred, Va.
 July 21–25 Duty in trenches.
 July 27–29 Demonstration on north side of James River
 July 27–28 Deep Bottom
 July 31 Moved to Washington, D.C.
 August 2 To Tennallytown, Md.
 August 7 - November 28 Sheridan's Shenandoah Valley Campaign. Attached to Army of the Shenandoah, Middle Military Division
 September 3–4 Berryville
 September 19 Battle of Opequan, Winchester
 September 22 Fisher's Hill
 October 19 Battle of Cedar Creek
 Orcober 20 Duty at Cedar Creek
 November 9 At Opequan
 November 19 Non-Veterans left front. Veterans consolidated to a Battalion of four Companies.
 December 7 Non-Veterans mustered out
1865
 January Ordered to Savannah, Ga.and attached to District of Savannah, Ga., Dept. of the South
 February - March Six new Companies organized for one year service and assigned as E, F, G, H, I, K.
 March Attached to 1st Brigade. 1st Division, 10th Army Corps, Army Ohio
1866
 February - March Companies E, F, G, H, I & K mustered out
 The regiment was discharged from service on April 18, 1866.

Total strength and casualties
The regiment lost 3 officers and 49 enlisted men killed in action or died of wounds.  2 officers and 237 died of disease for a total of 291 fatalities from all causes.

Officers
Field and staff officers
 Col. George Foster Shepley of Portland
 Lt. Col. William K. Kimball of Paris
 Lt. Col. and Adjutant Edward Ilsley of Lewiston
 Major David R. Hastings of Lovell
 Quartermaster Horatio Jose of Portland
 Surgeon James H. Thompson of Orono  
 Chaplain Joseph Colby of Gorham
 Sergent Major John W. Dana of Portland
Company officers
 Capt. Gideon A. Hastings of Bethel (Co. A)
 1st Lt. Elbridge Bolton of Portland (Co. A)
 2nd Lt. Charles D. Webb of Portland (Co. A)
 Capt. George A. Chadwell (Co. B)
 Capt. Charles Cutts Gookin Thornton of Scarborough (Co. C)
 1st Lt. Horatio Hight (Co. C)
 Capt. Elisha Winter of Dixfield (Co. D)
 Capt. Enoch Knight of Bridgton (Co. E)
 Capt. Seth C. Farrington of Fryeburgh (Co. F)
 Capt. Moses M. Robinson of Portland (Co. G)
 Capt. John F. Appleton of Bangor (Co. H)
 Capt. Menzies R. Fessenden of Portland (Co. I) 
 Capt. George Washburn of Calais (Co. K)

Mascots
"The oddest pets we have yet seen were two bears, which the 12th Maine regiment of the 19th Corps, led through the city recently. These bears were brought all the way from Louisiana, and have been in several fights. They have become perfectly tame and tractable, and march along at the head of the band, with an air that indicates they feel themselves veteran soldiers of the bruin order, and that they have a character to sustain."

See also

 List of Maine Civil War units
 Maine in the American Civil War

References

External links 

 Steve A. Hawks. The Civil War in the East: 12th Maine

Units and formations of the Union Army from Maine
1862 establishments in Maine
Military units and formations established in 1862
Military units and formations disestablished in 1866
1866 disestablishments in Maine